Mahina  is a small town and commune in the Cercle of Bafoulabé in the Kayes Region of south-western Mali. The commune includes 24 small villages of which the largest are Mahina, Diallola, Sékodounga and Niakalinssiraya. In the 2009 census the commune had a population of 26,754.

The Dakar-Niger Railway has a station at Mahina and the railroad crosses the Bafing River over a bridge built in 1895. The bridge was repaired in 2022.

References

Communes of Kayes Region